The cuisine of Mozambique has deeply been influenced by the Portuguese, who introduced new crops, flavorings, and cooking methods. The staple food for many Mozambicans is xima (chi-mah), a thick porridge made from maize/corn flour. Cassava and rice are also eaten as staple carbohydrates. All of these are served with sauces of vegetables, meat, beans or fish. Other typical ingredients include cashew nuts, onions, bay leaves, garlic, coriander, paprika, pepper, red pepper, sugar cane, corn, millet, sorghum and potatoes.

Gallery

See also
 African cuisine
 East African cuisine

References

External links
 Food in Mozambique

East African cuisine